Michel Folco (born 23 September 1943) is a French writer and photographer.

Before becoming a full time writer, Folco worked for various agencies as photographer.

Bibliography 

 Dieu et nous seuls pouvons (1991)
 Un loup est un loup (1995)
 En avant comme avant! (2001)
 Même le mal se fait bien (2008)
 La jeunesse mélancolique et très désabusée d'Adolf Hitler (2010)
 Ile Maurice
 La Reunion

References

People from Albi
1943 births
Living people
20th-century French novelists
21st-century French novelists
French photographers
20th-century French male writers
21st-century French male writers